Octaedro (translates to octahedron in English) is a book by Julio Cortázar published in 1974 after the release of Libro de Manuel in 1973. The book pops up before the controversy of Libro de Manuel which synthesizes politics and social narration into a new genre. All the stories were translated in English by Gregory Rabassa and published as part of the collection A Change of Light and Other Stories in 1980.

Content
Liliana llorando ("Liliana Weeping")
Los pasos en las huellas ("Footsteps in the Footprints")
Manuscrito hallado en un bolsillo ("Manuscript Found in a Pocket")
Verano ("Summer")
Ahí pero dónde, cómo ("There but Where, How")
Lugar llamado Kindberg ("A Place Named Kindberg")
Las fases de Severo ("Severo's Phases")
Cuello de gatito negro ("Throat of a Black Kitten")

Timeline
Julio Cortázar takes part in a reunion of the Russell Court II in Rome to examine the political situation and the violations of human rights in Latin America.

References

1974 books
Short story collections by Julio Cortázar